Princaxelia jamiesoni is a species of amphipod crustacean described in 2010. It is named after Alan Jamieson, a marine biologist from the University of Aberdeen.

References

External links
 (includes video)

Gammaridea
Crustaceans described in 2010